Central Otomi (San Felipe Otomi and Otomi del estado de México) is a Native American language spoken by 10,000 in San Felipe Santiago and in several neighboring towns in the Mexican state of Mexico, such as Chapa de Mota and Jilotepec de Abasolo. Also called 'State of Mexico Otomi', there are other varieties spoken in the state, such as Temoaya Otomi. The autonym is Hñatho or Hñotho.

Cited works

Notes

Otomi language

Languages of Mexico
Oto-Pamean languages